Tiger is a town in Rabun County, Georgia, United States. The population was 574 at the 2020 census, up from 408 at the 2010 census.

History
The Georgia General Assembly incorporated Tiger as a town in 1904.

There are two popular legends as to the derivation of the town's name: the first is that it was named after a Cherokee chief named Tiger Tail, while the second (and more likely) story is that the name originated from the cry of roaming panthers.

Geography

Tiger is located at  (34.846374, -83.434181). It lies in the extreme northeastern part of the state, just a few miles west of the Georgia-South Carolina border, and a few miles south of the Georgia-North Carolina border. The town sits at the base of 2,856-foot Tiger Mountain, a prominent Blue Ridge Mountain peak.

Demographics

As of the census of 2000, there were 316 people, 137 households, and 77 families residing in the town. The racial makeup of the town was 98.10% White and 1.90% African American. Hispanic or Latino people of any race were 1.90% of the population.

There were 137 households, out of which 25.5% had children under the age of 18 living with them, 46.0% were married couples living together, 8.8% had a female householder with no husband present, and 43.1% were non-families. 38.0% of all households were made up of individuals, and 15.3% had someone living alone who was 65 years of age or older.  The average household size was 2.23 and the average family size was 3.01.

In the town, the population was spread out, with 21.5% under the age of 18, 7.3% from 18 to 24, 23.1% from 25 to 44, 27.8% from 45 to 64, and 20.3% who were 65 years of age or older.  The median age was 44 years. For every 100 females, there were 88.1 males.  For every 100 females age 18 and over, there were 86.5 males.

The median income for a household in the town was $27,875, and the median income for a family was $31,563. Males had a median income of $26,875 versus $21,250 for females. The per capita income for the town was $15,453.  About 7.8% of families and 18.2% of the population were below the poverty line, including 20.4% of those under age 18 and 28.3% of those age 65 or over.

Education
The Rabun County Board of Education administrative offices are headquartered in the former South Rabun Elementary School building near the center of Tiger.  Just southeast of the city are Rabun County High School (grades 9-12), Rabun County Middle School (7-8), Rabun County Elementary School (3-6), and Rabun County Primary School (pre-kindergarten-2).

Economy 
The most prominent attractions in Tiger include the Tiger Drive-In, Goats on the Roof, Tiger Mountain Vineyards and Stonewall Creek Vineyards. Tiger is home to the Rabun County High School, Middle School, Elementary School, and Primary School as well as the county senior center, and an assisted living center named Traces of Tiger. Tiger is also home to Camp Covecrest, a Life Teen retreat center, mission base and summer camp.

Notable people
 Matt Gurtler, state representative
 Charlie Woerner, tight end for the San Francisco 49ers

References

External links

 Rabun County Chamber of Commerce
 Rabun County in the New Georgia Encyclopedia

Towns in Rabun County, Georgia
Towns in Georgia (U.S. state)